James La Rue Avery (November 27, 1945 – December 31, 2013) was an American actor. He was best known for his roles as Philip Banks in The Fresh Prince of Bel-Air, Shredder in Teenage Mutant Ninja Turtles, Judge Michael Conover on L.A. Law, Steve Yeager in The Brady Bunch Movie, Haroud Hazi Bin in Aladdin, and Dr. Crippen on The Closer (2005–2007).

Early life
Avery was born on November 27, 1945, in Pughsville, Virginia, to mother Florence J. Avery. His father denied paternity and was not listed on his birth certificate. Florence would eventually move James to Atlantic City, New Jersey. He served in the U.S. Navy in the Vietnam War from 1968 to 1969, and eventually moved to San Diego, California, where he began to write poetry and TV scripts for PBS. He won an Emmy for production during his tenure there, and then received a scholarship to UC San Diego, where he attended Thurgood Marshall College (then Third College), earning a Bachelor of Arts degree in drama and literature in 1976.

Career
Avery began his career in the 1980s with appearances in television series such as NBC's Hill Street Blues, Showtime sitcom Brothers as Bubba Dean, Amen, FM and L.A. Law. In the 1990s, he achieved prominence for his role as Philip Banks in The Fresh Prince of Bel-Air, a character that was ranked number 34 in TV Guides "50 Greatest TV Dads of All Time". After The Fresh Prince of Bel-Air ended, he played the lead role of Alonzo Sparks in the UPN comedy series Sparks that lasted for two seasons. Other notable roles in television included Dr. Crippen in The Closer, Charles Haysbert in The Division, and Michael Kelso's commanding officer at the police academy late in the series run of That '70s Show.

Among his most notable voice credits are the voices of Shredder in the original Teenage Mutant Ninja Turtles animated series, and James Rhodes/War Machine in the 1990s Iron Man series. He also lent his powerful bass voice as Junkyard Dog in Hulk Hogan's Rock 'n' Wrestling (1985–1986), Turbo in Rambo and the Forces of Freedom (1986), and Haroud Hazi Bin in Aladdin (1994).

Avery was the commencement speaker for his alma mater, UC San Diego's Thurgood Marshall College, in 2007 and again in 2012.

Personal life
In 1988, Avery married his girlfriend Barbara. Barbara was dean of student life at Loyola Marymount University. He had no biological children, but was a stepfather to Barbara's son, Kevin Waters.

Death
On December 31, 2013, Avery died at the age of 68 at Glendale Memorial Medical Center. His publicist, Cynthia Snyder, told the Associated Press that Avery died following complications from open heart surgery. Janet Hubert, who portrayed his on-screen wife Vivian on The Fresh Prince of Bel-Air for the first three seasons, said after his death: "RIP James, all the world is a stage, and we are all merely players in this production called LIFE." Will Smith commented on Avery's death, saying: "Some of my greatest lessons in acting, living, and being a respectable human being came through James Avery. Every young man needs an Uncle Phil. Rest in peace." Alfonso Ribeiro, who played his on-screen son Carlton, said: “I'm deeply saddened to say that James Avery has passed away. He was a second father to me. I will miss him greatly". Joseph Marcell (Geoffrey) called Avery a "gentle giant".

Avery's remains were cremated and scattered near the Pacific Ocean. In April 2020, Will Smith reunited with the cast of The Fresh Prince of Bel-Air on a video conference honoring Avery's best moments on the show.

Filmography

Film

Television

Video games

References

External links
 
 
 The HistoryMakers Biography, photos and video clips

1945 births
2013 deaths
African-American male actors
African-American poets
American male film actors
American male poets
American male television actors
American male voice actors
American television personalities
Male television personalities
American television writers
American male television writers
Male actors from New Jersey
Male actors from Virginia
People from Atlantic City, New Jersey
People from Suffolk, Virginia
Screenwriters from California
Screenwriters from New Jersey
Screenwriters from Virginia
United States Navy personnel of the Vietnam War
United States Navy sailors
University of California, San Diego alumni
Virginia State University alumni
20th-century American male actors
21st-century American male actors
20th-century American poets
African-American screenwriters
20th-century American male writers
20th-century African-American writers
21st-century African-American people
African-American male writers
African-American United States Navy personnel
African Americans in the Vietnam War
Deaths from complications of heart surgery